Twenty-Five or 25 may refer to:

25 (number), the natural number following 24 and preceding 26
 one of the years 25 BC, AD 25, 1925, 2025

Music
Twenty Five (album), a 2006 greatest hits album by George Michael
Twenty Five (DVD), released alongside the George Michael album
25 (A-ha album), 2010
25 (Adele album), 2015
25 (Blues Traveler album), 2012
25 (G Herbo album), 2021
25 (Harry Connick, Jr. album), 1992
25 (Oysterband album), 2003
25 (Patty Larkin album), 2010
25 (EP), a 2014 EP by Song Ji-eun
"25", a song by The Pretty Reckless from Death by Rock and Roll, 2021
"25", a song by The Smith Street Band from More Scared of You Than You Are of Me, 2017
"Twenty Five", a song by Karma to Burn from the album Wild, Wonderful Purgatory, 1999

Other uses
"Twenty-Five", an alternative name for the Irish card game Spoil Five
"Twenty Five" (The West Wing), a 2003 episode of the television series The West Wing
Renault 25

See also 
 List of highways numbered 25